The 1989 SEC Men’s Basketball Tournament took place from March 9–12, 1989 at the University of Tennessee’s Thompson–Boling Arena in Knoxville, Tennessee. The Alabama Crimson Tide won the tournament and received the SEC's automatic bid to the NCAA Division I Men’s Basketball tournament by defeating Florida by a score of 72–60 in the championship game on March 12, 1989.

Jefferson Pilot Teleproductions (in its third season of producing regionally syndicated SEC basketball games) provided television coverage of the first round, the quarterfinals, and the semifinals. Coverage of the championship game was broadcast on the ABC Television Network through its sports division, ABC Sports.

Bracket

References

SEC men's basketball tournament
1988–89 Southeastern Conference men's basketball season
Sports in Knoxville, Tennessee
1989 in sports in Tennessee
College sports tournaments in Tennessee
Basketball competitions in Tennessee